Hypoxis  is a  genus of flowering plants of the family Hypoxidaceae. The genus has an "almost cosmopolitan" distribution, occurring in Africa, the Americas, Asia, and Australia. Europe lacks native species. Most species are in the Southern Hemisphere, especially in southern Africa. Common names for the genus include star-grass, star lily, yellow stars, African potato, and stars. The genus is the largest of the Hypoxidaceae and has its centre of variation in South Africa, where it occurs in open undisturbed grasslands. The name Hypoxis was taken over by Linnaeus in 1759 from a name coined by Paul Reneaulme in 1611 for a superficially similar species of Gagea and meaning "a little sour", referring to the taste of that plant's leaves.

Description
These plants are perennial herbs with corms or rhizomes. Some have tubers. The aboveground herbage is a layered cluster of lance-shaped, linear, or hairlike leaves, sometimes sheathed together at the bases. The blades are usually at least slightly hairy. The flowers are borne on a short, stemlike scape in a raceme or umbel arrangement, or sometimes singly. The flower has six yellow tepals which may be hairy, especially on the undersides. The undersides may also be whitish or tinged green or red. Occasional flowers have 4 or 8 tepals. The fruit is a capsule with a few to many small, oily seeds.

The seeds are needed to identify many species. Most have seeds less than 2 millimeters long, so microscopic examination is required.

Uses
Hypoxis plants have long played a role in traditional African medicine; H. hemerocallidea and H. colchicifolia are the best known species used to make medicine and teas.  The genus is not only used in traditional medicine, it has become important also in pharmaceutical preparations.

Archaeological evidence found in ashes in Border Cave, South Africa has revealed that early humans roasted the rhizomes of some of the more palatable species of Hypoxis as long as 170,000 years ago.

Species
Sources have estimated 90 or 100 to 150 species in the genus. , the World Checklist of Selected Plant Families recognized 90 species:

Hypoxis abyssinica Hochst.
Hypoxis acuminata Baker
Hypoxis angustifolia Lam.
Hypoxis argentea Harv. ex Baker
Hypoxis arillacea R.J.F.Hend.
Hypoxis aurea Lour.
Hypoxis bampsiana Wiland
Hypoxis camerooniana Baker
Hypoxis canaliculata Baker
Hypoxis catamarcensis Brackett
Hypoxis colchicifolia Baker
Hypoxis colliculata Sánchez-Ken
Hypoxis costata Baker
Hypoxis cuanzensis Welw. ex Baker
Hypoxis curtissii Rose in J.K.Small – Curtiss' star-grass
Hypoxis decumbens L.
Hypoxis demissa Nel
Hypoxis dinteri Nel
Hypoxis domingensis Urb.
Hypoxis exaltata Nel
Hypoxis exilis R.J.F.Hend. – swamp star
Hypoxis filiformis Baker
Hypoxis fischeri Pax
Hypoxis flanaganii Baker
Hypoxis floccosa Baker
Hypoxis galpinii Baker
Hypoxis gardneri R.J.F.Hend.
Hypoxis gerrardii Baker
Hypoxis glabella R.Br. – star grass, tiny star
Hypoxis goetzei Harms
Hypoxis gregoriana Rendle
Hypoxis hemerocallidea Fisch. – African potato
Hypoxis hirsuta (L.) Coville – common goldstar
Hypoxis humilis Kunth
Hypoxis hygrometrica  Labill. – golden weather-glass
Hypoxis interjecta Nel
Hypoxis juncea Sm. – fringed yellow star-grass
Hypoxis kilimanjarica Baker
Hypoxis kraussiana Buchinger ex C.Krauss
Hypoxis lata Nel
Hypoxis lejolyana Wiland
Hypoxis leucotricha Fritsch
Hypoxis limicola B.L.Burtt
Hypoxis longifolia Baker
Hypoxis lucens McVaugh
Hypoxis ludwigii Baker
Hypoxis lusalensis Wiland
Hypoxis malaissei Wiland
Hypoxis marginata R.Br.
Hypoxis membranacea Baker
Hypoxis mexicana Schult. & Schult.f.  – Mexican yellow star-grass
Hypoxis monanthos Baker
Hypoxis muhilensis Wiland
Hypoxis multiceps Buchinger ex Baker
Hypoxis neliana Schinz
Hypoxis nervosa R.J.F.Hend.
Hypoxis nivea Y.Singh
Hypoxis nyasica Baker
Hypoxis oblonga Nel
Hypoxis obtusa Burch. ex Ker Gawl.
Hypoxis occidentalis Benth.
Hypoxis oligophylla Baker
Hypoxis parvifolia Baker
Hypoxis parvula Baker
Hypoxis polystachya Welw. ex Baker
Hypoxis potosina Brackett
Hypoxis pratensis R.Br.
Hypoxis protrusa Nel
Hypoxis pulchella G.L.Nesom
Hypoxis rigida Chapm.
Hypoxis rigidula Baker
Hypoxis robusta Nel
Hypoxis sagittata Nel
Hypoxis salina M.Lyons & Keighery
Hypoxis schimperi Baker

Hypoxis sessilis L.
Hypoxis setosa Baker
Hypoxis sobolifera Jacq.
Hypoxis stellipilis Ker Gawl.
Hypoxis suffruticosa Nel
Hypoxis symoensiana Wiland
Hypoxis tepicensis Brackett
Hypoxis tetramera Hilliard & B.L.Burtt
Hypoxis uniflorata Markötter
Hypoxis upembensis Wiland
Hypoxis urceolata Nel
Hypoxis vaginata  Schltdl. – yellow star
Hypoxis villosa L.f.
Hypoxis wrightii (Baker) Brackett
Hypoxis zeyheri Baker

Gallery

References

External links
Hypoxis. Red List of South African Plants. SANBI.
GRIN Species Records of Hypoxis. Germplasm Resources Information Network (GRIN).
Hypoxis. ITIS.

 
Asparagales genera